Mekliganj Assembly constituency is an assembly constituency in Cooch Behar district in the Indian state of West Bengal. It is reserved for scheduled castes.

Overview
As per orders of the Delimitation Commission, No. 1 Mekliganj Assembly constituency (SC) covers Mekliganj municipality, Mekliganj community development block, Haldibari municipality and Haldibari community development block.

Mekliganj Assembly constituency is part of No. 3 Jalpaiguri (Lok Sabha constituency) (SC).

Members of Legislative Assembly

Election Results

2021
In 2021 election, All India Trinamool Congress candidate Paresh Chandra Adhikary defeated Bharatiya Janata Party candidate Dadhiram Ray by a margin of 14,685 votes.

2016

2011
In the 2011 elections, Paresh Chandra Adhikary of AIFB defeated his nearest rival Jayanta Kumar Ray of Congress.

1977-2006
In the 2006 state assembly elections, Paresh Chandra Adhikary of Forward Bloc won the Mekliganj seat defeating his nearest rival Sunil Chandra Roy of Trinamool Congress. Contests in most years were multi cornered but only winners and runners are being mentioned. In 2001, Paresh Chandra Adhikary of Forward Bloc defeated Ramesh Roy of Trinmool Congress. In 1996, Ramesh Roy representing Forward Bloc defeated Sunil Chandra Roy representing Congress. In 1991, Paresh Chandra Adhikary of Forward Bloc defeated Mani Bhusan Roy of Congress. Sada Kanta Roy of Forward Bloc defeated Madhu Sudan Roy of Congress in 1987, Niren Chowdhury of ICS in 1982 and Madhu Sudan Roy of Congress in 1977.

1951-1972
Madhu Sudan Roy of Congress won in 1972. Mihir Kumar Ray of Forward Bloc won in 1971. Amarendra Nath Roy Pradhan of Forward Bloc won in 1969, 1967 and 1962. Prasanta Chatterjee of Congress won in 1957 and in independent India's first election in 1951.

References

Assembly constituencies of West Bengal
Politics of Cooch Behar district